Avonmore may refer to:

Places
Canada
Avonmore, North Stormont, Ontario
Avonmore, Edmonton, a neighborhood in Edmonton, Alberta

Ireland
Avonmore, County Cork 
River Avonmore in County Wicklow

United States
Avonmore, Pennsylvania

Music
Avonmore (Bryan Ferry album), 2014

Other 
Viscount Avonmore, a title of nobility
Avonmore, an Irish dairy cooperative later merged into Tirlán
Avonmore, a nitrate clipper (windjammer) sunk at the storm at Huanillos in 1877